Adonis Afrim Ajeti (born 26 February 1997) is a Swiss professional footballer who plays as a defender. 

He is the twin brother of Albian Ajeti who plays for Scottish club Celtic and the younger brother of Arlind Ajeti. Adonis holds dual citizenship, the Swiss where he was born and grew up and the Albanian citizenship due to his parents' origin.

Club career

Early career
The Ajeti twins started their youth football with Basel in 2005, at the same time as their elder brother moved to the club from Concordia. In the 2011–12 and 2012–13 seasons Adonis played in Basel's U-16 and with the team he twice became Swiss Champion at this level. During the 2012–13 season he also played in their U-18 team. On 30 April 2013, the twin brothers both signed their first professional contracts with the club, thus also becoming part of their first team. During the 2013–14 season he was called into their U-21 team.

Basel
Ajeti made his first professional debut with Basel in the closing match of the 2015–16 UEFA Europa League group stage against Lech Poznań on 10 December 2015 coming on as a substitute at half-time in place of Michael Lang in a 0–1 away victory. He became the last of the brothers to make a professional debut also with Basel. Due to absence of Marek Suchý injured and since Basel had already secured the qualification to the knockout phase, the coach Urs Fischer invited him to participate in the match.

Wil
Following his professional debut with Basel, Ajeti continued his professional career at Swiss Challenge League club FC Wil 1900, where he signed on 7 February 2016 a contract until 30 June 2020.

International career
Ajeti played in several friendly matches with Switzerland national under-15 football team during the spring 2012 under the coach Yves Débonnaire including a full 80-minutes match against Belgium under-15 in where he played as a Captain and scored a goal in a 5–3 win. Later in the same year in autumn and again under the same coach he captained Switzerland national under-16 football team in three friendly matches. He continued in 2013 captaining Switzerland national under-17 football team in two friendly matches in August against Germany and Austria. Then in 2015 he played for Switzerland national under-18 football team in a double friendly match against England on 26 and 28 March where he scored a goal.

Personal life
Despite having been born in and grown up in Switzerland, all "Ajeti brothers" have a good knowledge of the Albanian language, the language of their parents, as they have always communicated in Albanian at home.

Career statistics

Club

References

External links

1997 births
Twin sportspeople
Swiss twins
Footballers from Basel
Swiss people of Albanian descent
Living people
Swiss men's footballers
Albanian footballers
Association football defenders
Switzerland youth international footballers
FC Basel players
FC Wil players
FC St. Gallen players
FC Chiasso players
Swiss Super League players
Swiss Challenge League players